Pirate Life Brewing is a brewery located in Adelaide, South Australia, that produces craft beer. Established in 2014 by Jack Cameron, Michael Cameron and Jared Proudfoot, the company officially launched in 2015 after the three founders relocated from Western Australia to open the brewery. In 2016 Pirate Life set up a distribution company for their products, Pirate Cartel, after a partial acquisition of their previous distributor. The following year Pirate Life were acquired by Anheuser-Busch InBev. After they were acquired, Pirate Life announced plans for a larger scale expansion, "quadrupling" production through a new facility in Port Adelaide.

See also

Beer in Australia
List of breweries in Australia
South Australian food and drink

References

External links 
 

Australian beer brands
Australian companies established in 2014
Beer brewing companies based in South Australia
Food and drink companies established in 2014
AB InBev brands